Alain Le Bussy (1947 – 14 October 2010) was a prolific Belgian author of science fiction who won the Prix Rosny-Aîné in 1993 for his novel Deltas. He died on 14 October 2010 from complications following throat surgery.

His writing career started in 1961 publishing an article on gender in the journal 'Conjunct', it was not until 1968 when he wrote first novel. He wrote more than thirty novels with several of these in the series "Aqualia" and "Yorg." He was also an active member of science fiction fandom, the creator of the fanzine Xuensè (an anagram of Esneux, the first magazine he worked for) and an organizer of science fiction conventions. In 1995, he was inducted into the European Science Fiction Society Hall of Fame.

Bibliography
Djamol de Kiv, 2011 (Published posthumously)
La Marque, 2010
Piège Vital, 2009
Aqualia, Tome 4: Chercheau, 2008
Jouvence, 2007
Les Filles, 2006
Aqualia, Tome 2: Cercacier, 2006
Aqualia, Tome 3: Colocta, 2006
Aqualia, Tome 1: Dilterre, 2005
Ruptures, 2005
Yorg of the Island, 2004
Les Otages de la Dent Blanche, 2003
The Hostages of the Dent Blanche, 2003
La Porte de Lumière, 2003
The Gate of Light, 2003
Soleil Mortel, 1999

Published with Black River between 1992 and 1999
 Deltas (Prix Rosny aîné 1993) Deltas (Price Rosny Elder 1993)
 Tremblemer Tremblemer
 Déraag Déraag
 Envercœur Envercœur
 Garmalia Garmalia
 Quête impériale Imperial Quest
 Yorg de l'île Yorg Island
 Rork des plaines Rork Plains
 Hou des machines Hou machines
 Soleil fou Crazy sun
 Chatinika Chatinika
 Le dieu avide The greedy god
 Jana des couloirs Jana corridors
 Jorvan de la mer Jorvan Sea
 Djamol de Kîv Djamol of Kiv
 Équilibre Balance
 La route du sud The southern route
 Nexus de feu Nexus Fire
 Le Maître d'Iquand The Master of Iquand
 Le Mendiant de Karnathok The Beggar Karnathok

Awards

References

1947 births
2010 deaths
Belgian science fiction writers